Mór Wertner (German: Moritz Wertner, Moriz Wertner) (born July 26, 1849, in Ispáca; died June 8, 1921, in Párkány) was a Hungarian historian and genealogist.

Publications
Die Pest in Ungarn 1708–1777 (Leipzig, 1880)
Orvosrégészeti tanulmányok (Budapest, 1883)
Historisch-genealogische Irrthümer (Wien, 1884)
Genealogie und Geschichte (Wien, 1884)
A középkori délszláv uralkodók genealogiai története, nyomtatott a Csanád-Egyházmegyei Könyvsajtón (Temesvár, 1891)
A magyar nemzetségek a XVI. sz. közepéig I-II (Temesvár, 1891)
Az Árpádok családi története (Pleitz Ferencz Pál Könyvnyomdája, Nagy-Becskerek, 1892)
Negyedik Béla király története (Temesvár, 1893)
A Hunyadiak (Déva, 1900)
Hunyadmegye legrégibb tisztikara (Déva, 1900)
Névmagyarázatok I. Férfi és helységnevek (Budapest, 1916)
Névmagyarázatok II. Régi magyar női nevek (Budapest, 1917)

Footnotes

External links
List of publications by Moriz Wertner

1849 births
1921 deaths
20th-century Hungarian historians
19th-century Hungarian historians